Live At Blues West 14 is Mo Foster's fourth solo album.

All tracks were produced and arranged by Mo and mixed by Simon Smart.

Live At Blues West 14 was released on the Angel Air label in 2006.

Track listing 
 "Hot Buttered Cats" – 7:40
 "Prelude - That Dream Again" – 1:07
 "So Far Away" – 6:15
 "Oh No" – 5:01
 "The Cry of The Unheard" – 4:59
 "Prelude - Blues SW19" – 2:28
 "Tricotism" – 4:18
 "Let's Go On Somewhere" – 5:25
 "Tradewinds" – 4:14
 "The Four Susans" – 6:05
 "The Importance Of Being Invoiced" – 3:49
 "Crete: Yet Another Visit" – 4:36
 "Blues For B&C" – 5:53

Personnel
 Mo Foster - Bass guitar, Fretless Bass, Acoustic Guitar, keyboards
 Ray Russell - Electric Guitar, Acoustic Guitar
 Simon Chamberlain - Piano
 Dave Hartley - Piano
 Phil Peskett - Piano, keyboards
 Nick Brown - Electric Piano
 Gary Husband - drums
 Ralph Salmins - drums
 Iain Bellamy - Soprano Saxophone
 Corrina Silvester - percussion
 Frank Ricotti - percussion

Writing Credits
All tracks were written by Mo with the exception of: 
 "So Far Away" written by Mo Foster and Ray Russell
 "Prelude - Blues SW19" written by Simon Chamberlain 
 "Tricotism" written by Oscar Pettiford.

Technical details
The album was recorded live on the Northpond Mobile at Blues West 14, Kensington, London and engineered by Paul Leader with the exceptions of:
 "Prelude - That Dream Again": Recorded live at Lauderdale House, Highgate, London. Engineered by Paul Leader.
 "Hot Buttered Cats": Recorded live at Cinque Ports, Uckfield, Sussex. Engineered by Rik Walton.

Mo Foster albums
2006 live albums
Angel Air albums